Blue Mitchell (also known as Soul Village) is an album by American trumpeter Blue Mitchell recorded in 1971 and released on the Mainstream label.

Reception
The Allmusic review by Scott Yanow awarded the album 4 stars stating "In general, Blue Mitchell's five Mainstream albums from 1971-74 are not on the same level as his best Blue Notes, but they tend to be worthwhile".

Track listing
All compositions by Blue Mitchell except as indicated
 "Soul Village" – 6:16   
 "Blues For Thelma" – 7:03   
 "Queen Bey" – 4:51   
 "Are You Real" (Benny Golson, Sergio Mihanovich) – 7:21   
 "Mi Hermano" – 5:17
Recorded in New York City in March 1971.

Personnel
Blue Mitchell – trumpet
Jimmy Forrest – tenor saxophone
Walter Bishop, Jr. – piano
Larry Gales – bass
Doug Sides – drums

References

Mainstream Records albums
Blue Mitchell albums
1971 albums
Albums produced by Bob Shad